Stroud is an unincorporated community in Chambers County, Alabama, United States, located along U.S. Route 431. Stroud was home to James Wyly Grady, who served in the Alabama Legislature. A post office operated under the name Stroud from 1882 to 1957.

Demographics

References

External links
 Picture of the Stroud Railway Depot

Unincorporated communities in Chambers County, Alabama
Unincorporated communities in Alabama